This page includes the full discography of British singer Sarah Brightman, including albums, singles, and theatre cast recordings.

Albums

Studio albums

Albums with Andrew Lloyd Webber

Live albums

Limited release

Compilation albums

Cast recordings

Video albums

Singles

1970s

1980s

1990s

2000s

2010s

2020s

Guest appearances

References

External links
 A Guide to Sarah Brightman's Discography
 Early Sarah Brightman

Discographies of British artists
Discography
Disco discographies